Aayololo is a Bus Rapid Transit System, was inaugurated on the 25th of November 2016, in Ghana which is operational in Accra the Capital. Bus Rapid Transit system are special because  particular lines are dedicated for the buses which allows them to move faster through traffic, along their routes.

Aayalolo  system Started in 2016, it started work  from Accra to Amasaman and  Accra to Ofankor. It was initially  planned as a Bus Transit System with dedicated lanes, but because these lanes  were not provided  it was renamed Quality Bus System (QBS).

Aayalolo is a word from the Ga language which means "still moving on".

Currently Aaylolo operates from Accra to Amasaman, Adentan to Accra, Kasoa to Accra and Ofankor to Accra. 

It also started operating in the city of Tamale in March 2022. It rans along the Tamale-Nyankpala, and Tamale-Dungu routes.

Regulation 
The BRT is under the Urban Transport Project (UTP) of the Ministry of Roads and Highways.

Funding 
The projected is funded by four  parties,   The World Bank, The Agence Francaise de Development (AFD), The Government of Ghana and the Global Environment Facility Trust Fund and was implemented by  the Ministry of Local Government and Rural Development, the Ministry of Roads and Highways and the Department of Urban Roads. The initial cost estimate was $95 million.

Controversies 
On Monday, 24 February 2020, Drivers of Aayalolo Bus Rapid Transit System began a sit-down strike.  They claim their salaries have not been paid by their employers for seven months.

However the Greater Accra Passenger Transport Executive's GAPTE claims its not true and they have been paid.

Challenges 
The bus system was meant to use e-card as payment instead of cash, however management of the company could not provide e-cards to customers after they ran out.

References 

Bus rapid transit in Africa
Road transport in Ghana
Bus transport in Africa
Transport companies of Ghana